Events in the year 1895 in China.

Incumbents
Guangxu Emperor (21st year)

Events
January 20-February 12 - First Sino-Japanese War: Battle of Weihaiwei
March 4 - First Sino-Japanese War: Battle of Yingkou
April 17 - Treaty of Shimonoseki with Empire of Japan
 islands of Taiwan and Penghu ceded to Japan
April 23 - Triple Intervention by Russian Empire, German Empire and French Third Republic.
May 5 - Prime Minister of Japan Ito Hirobumi announces withdrawal of Japanese troops from Liaodong Peninsula
May-October - Taiwanese Resistance to the Japanese Invasion (1895)
August 1 - Kucheng Massacre
 Dungan Revolt (1895–96), a rebellion of various Chinese Muslim ethnic groups in Qinghai and Gansu against the Qing dynasty

Births
March 1 - Deng Yanda
March 30 - Cai Hesen
Liu Wenhui
Ji Hongchang
Wang Fengge

Deaths
 February 10 - Liu Buchan
 February 12 - Ding Ruchang
 Lu Haodong
 Zhu Hongzhang

References

 
Years of the 19th century in China